Egor Baranov (born  December 3, 1988 in Yekaterinburg) is a Russian film director.  In 2006, he entered the All-Russian State Institute of Cinematography for directing faculty, studied in the studio of Sergei Solovyov and Valery Rubinchik. In 2018 he graduated from the university with a red diploma.

In 2012 Baranov published his directorial debut, Suicide, with Yevgeny Stychkin, Alexey Vorobyov and Oksana Akinshina.

Thriller Locust appeared on the Russian screens in 2015.  In the lead roles were involved Paulina Andreeva and Pyotr Fyodorov.
In 2015, a series was released from the producers Alexander Tsekalo and Alexander Kott Fartsa, created by Egor Baranov, as well as the Japanese Orthodox Western that he shot with the participation of Cary-Hiroyuki Tagawa and Ivan Okhlobystin Priest-San.

In 2016, Egor filmed the psychological series Sparta with Artyom Tkachenko and Alexander Petrov, and in 2017 the premiere of his mystical film Gogol. The Beginning with Alexander Petrov in the title role, the first of film series Gogol.

Filmography 
Suicides  (2012)
Nightingale the Robber   (2012)
Locust (2013)
Priest-San (2015)
Fartsa (TV series) (2015)
Gogol. The Beginning (2017)
Gogol. Viy (2018)
Gogol. Terrible Revenge (2018)
Sparta (2018)
 The Blackout (2019)

References

External links
 

1988 births
Living people
Russian film directors
Mass media people from Yekaterinburg
Russian screenwriters
Male screenwriters
Gerasimov Institute of Cinematography alumni
Russian film producers